The Black Fork is a principal tributary of the Mohican River,  long, in north-central Ohio in the United States. According to the Geographic Names Information System, it has also been known historically as "Armstrongs Creek" and "Black Fork Creek".

A U.S. Army Corps of Engineers dam in Ashland County, completed in 1936, causes the Black Fork to form Charles Mill Lake.

See also
List of rivers of Ohio
Ohio River flood of 1937

References

Rivers of Ohio
Rivers of Ashland County, Ohio
Rivers of Richland County, Ohio